Thorunna africana is a small species of sea slug, a dorid nudibranch, a shell-less marine gastropod mollusk in the family Chromodorididae.

Distribution 
This species was described from the Sudanese Red Sea and Tanzania with the type locality being Dar Es Salaam. It has been reported from Madagascar and the Andaman Islands.

Description
It is white in colour with a yellow, ruffled, margin to the mantle. The gills and rhinophores are white with bright red lines.

Ecology
Thorunna africana feeds on sponges of the genus Dysidea.

References

Chromodorididae
Gastropods described in 1984